The Royal Palace, also known as King Toffa's Palace and more recently Musée Honmé, is a former royal residence and today museum in Porto-Novo, Benin.

It contains an example of an Alounloun and most displays are related to the King Toffa period.

World Heritage Site 

The palace and the surrounding district was added to the UNESCO World Heritage Tentative List on October 31, 1996, in the Cultural category.

Gallery

References

Museums in Benin
Buildings and structures in Porto-Novo